Royce Stephon Parran (born August 4, 1985) is an American professional basketball player who last played for Belfius Mons-Hainaut of the Belgian Basketball League. He played college basketball for Chicago State University. He finished his collegiate career as Chicago State's all-time leading scorer in their NCAA Division I era, with 1,510 points.

College statistics

|-
| align="left" | 2003–04
| align="left" | Chicago State
| 31 || 8 || 23.3 || .448 || .429 || .878 || 2.10 || 2.16 || 1.29 || 0.03 || 8.68
|-
| align="left" | 2004–05
| align="left" | Chicago State
| 28 || 26 || 27.1 || .434 || .293 || .691 || 1.71 || 2.68 || 1.71 || 0.04 || 9.96
|-
| align="left" | 2005–06
| align="left" | Chicago State
| 30 || 29 || 19.3 || .413 || .399 || .762 || 3.40 || 3.87 || 1.87 || 0.03 || 18.03
|-
| align="left" | 2006–07
| align="left" | Chicago State
| 29 || 24 || 34.1 || .437 || .350 || .827 || 3.10 || 4.69 || 2.21 || 0.14 || 14.52

References

External links
 
 
 
 
 

1985 births
Living people
American expatriate basketball people in Belgium
American expatriate basketball people in Canada
American expatriate basketball people in North Macedonia
American expatriate basketball people in Montenegro
Basketball players from Chicago
Belfius Mons-Hainaut players
Chicago State Cougars men's basketball players
Point guards
American men's basketball players